Awakening the Zodiac is a 2017 Canadian mystery crime drama film directed by Jonathan Wright and starring Shane West and Leslie Bibb.

Premise
A couple buy a storage unit, finding evidence of the Zodiac Killer and try to solve the case.

Cast
Shane West as Mick Branson
Leslie Bibb as Zoe Branson
Matt Craven as Harvey
Kenneth Welsh as Ben
Nicholas Campbell as Ray
Stephen McHattie as Zodiac
John Bregar as Adam
Eva Link as Lula
Jennie Esnard as Tina
Douglas Kidd as Officer
Sandra Wilson as Front Desk Woman

Production
Although the film is set in Virginia, the film was shot in Ontario, especially in Almonte, outside of Ottawa.

Reception
The film has 45% rating on Rotten Tomatoes.  Barry Hertz of The Globe and Mail awarded the film one star out of four.

References

External links
 
 

Canadian mystery films
Canadian crime drama films
English-language Canadian films
Films set in Virginia
Films shot in Ottawa
Vertical Entertainment films
Cultural depictions of the Zodiac Killer
Films directed by Jonathan Wright (director)
Films scored by Mark Korven
2010s English-language films
2010s Canadian films